The Encyclopedia of the Holocaust (1990) has been called "the most recognized reference book on the Holocaust".  It was published in an English-language translated edition by Macmillan in tandem with the Hebrew language original edition published by Yad Vashem (יד ושם), the Holocaust Remembrance Authority in Israel. All its contributors are reputable Holocaust scholars and academics. Although the encyclopedia is easy to read and use and contains no disturbing pictures, it is not recommended for users younger than high school age.

The Encyclopedia was the winner of the 1991 American Library Association’s Dartmouth Medal.

Features
 Basic introductory overview of the Holocaust written by Elie Wiesel.
 Glossary
 Chronology
 Maps, illustrations, photographs
 Persons of interest
 Places of interest (including concentration camps, ghettos, murder sites)
 Political movements and resistance movements.
 Major Jewish organizations in Germany 1893-1943
 Structure of the einsatzgruppen
 Nuremberg Trial results
 Subsequent Nuremberg proceedings
 Subsequent British trial results
 Estimated Jewish losses in the Holocaust

International Editorial Board
Editor in chief:
 Israel Gutman, Yad Vashem; Hebrew University of Jerusalem.

The other editors: 
 Yitzhak Arad, Yad Vashem, Jerusalem
 Yehuda Bauer, Hebrew University of Jerusalem
 Randolph L. Braham, City University of New York
 Martin Broszat (1926–1989), University of Munich
 Christopher R. Browning, University of North Carolina
 Richard I. (Yerachmiel) Cohen, Hebrew University of Jerusalem
 Henry L. Feingold, City University of New York
 Saul Friedländer, Tel Aviv University
 Martin Gilbert, University of London
 Andreas Hillgruber (1925–1989), University of Cologne
 Eberhard Jäckel, University of Stuttgart
 Steven Katz, Boston University, USA
 Shmuel Krakowski, Yad Vashem, Jerusalem
 Otto Dov Kulka, Hebrew University of Jerusalem
 Dov Levin, Hebrew University of Jerusalem
 Czesław Madajczyk, Polish Academy of Sciences, Warsaw
 Michael Marrus, University of Toronto
 György Ránki, Hungarian Academy of Sciences, Budapest
 Jehuda Reinharz, Brandeis University, USA
 Shmuel Spector, Yad Vashem, Jerusalem
 Jerzy Tomaszewski, University of Warsaw
 Aharon Weiss, Yad Vashem; University of Haifa
 Leni Yahil, University of Haifa
 Geoffrey Wigoder editor of the English edition.

References

External links
 The entire Encyclopedia of the Holocaust, online, on Yad Vashem website

Further reading
 Encyclopedia of the Holocaust, Israel Gutman, editor-in-chief. New York: Macmillan, 1990. 4 volumes. .
 Ha-Entsiklopedya shel ha-Shoah (Hebrew: האנציקלופדיה של השואה), Israel Gutman, editor-in-chief. Jerusalem: Yad Vashem; Tel Aviv: Sifriat Poalim Publishing House, 1990. 6 volumes. 

1990 non-fiction books
Holocaust
History books about the Holocaust
Jewish encyclopedias
Books published by Yad Vashem